Schlömer is a surname. Notable people with the surname include:

  (born 1971), German politician
 Helmuth Schlömer (1893–1995), German Wehrmacht general